Stage Fright or Lamp Fever (German: Lampenfieber) is a 1960 West German drama film directed by Kurt Hoffmann and starring Dunja Movar, Bernhard Wicki and Antje Weisgerber.

It was shot at the Bavaria Studios in Munich. The film's sets were designed by the art director Elisabeth Urbancic.

Cast
 Dunja Movar as Gitta Crusius 
 Bernhard Wicki as Rohrbach 
 Antje Weisgerber as Elsa Kaiser 
 Gustav Knuth as Herr Seipel 
 Anne Kersten as Frau Wehrhahn 
 Henry Vahl as Herr Körner 
 Eva Vaitl as Frau Seipel 
 Elke Sommer as Evelyne 
 Claus Wilcke as Bastian 
 Corinna Genest as Katja 
 Gitty Djamal as Elisabeth 
 Dieter Klein as Caspar 
 Michael Hinz as Peter 
 Inken Deter as Grete Seipel 
 Helmut Förnbacher as Thomas 
 Erna Sellmer as Kantinenwirtin Hochgesell 
 Dieter Hildebrandt as Atze Müller 
 Hans Schweikart as Intendant 
 Peter Striebeck as 1. Schauspielschüler 
 Klaus Dahlen as 2. Schauspielschüler 
 Peter Kors as Schauspieler in Kernstadt 
  as Schauspieler in Kernstadt 
 Werner Schwuchow as Schauspieler in Kernstadt 
 Minna Spaeth as Schauspielerin in Kernstadt 
 Paul Bürks as himself 
 Hans Clarin as himself 
 August Everding as himself 
 Erwin Faber as himself 
 Veronika Fitz as herself 
 Robert Graf as himself 
 Margarete Haagen as herself 
 Harry Hertzsch as himself 
 Eva Maria Meineke as herself 
 Hannes Messemer as himself 
 Ina Peters as herself 
 Rosel Schäfer as herself 
 Johanna von Koczian as herself 
 Annemarie Wernicke as herself

References

Bibliography
 Tim Bergfelder, Erica Carter & Deniz Göktürk. The German Cinema Book. BFI, 2002.
 Bock, Hans-Michael & Bergfelder, Tim. The Concise CineGraph. Encyclopedia of German Cinema. Berghahn Books, 2009.

External links 
 

1960 films
1960 drama films
German drama films
West German films
1960s German-language films
Films directed by Kurt Hoffmann
Films about actors
Films about educators
Constantin Film films
Films shot at Bavaria Studios
1960s German films